Rio Communities is a city in Valencia County, New Mexico, United States. Prior to its incorporation on May 16, 2013, it was a census-designated place (CDP). The CDP population was 4,723 as of the 2010 census.

Geography
Rio Communities is located at  (34.641895, -106.727021).

Demographics

As of the census of 2010, there were 4,723 people, 1,996 households, and 1,318 families residing in the CDP. There were 2,221 housing units. The racial makeup of the CDP was 83.4% White, 46.2% Hispanic or Latino, 2.3% African American, 1.7% were Native American, 0.5% Asian, 9.1% from other races, and 3% from two or more races.

There were 1,996 households, out of which 24.5% had children under the age of 18 living with them, 49.3% were married couples living together, 4.9% had a male householder with no wife present, 11.8% had a female householder with no husband present, and 34% were non-families. 29.4% of all households were made up of individuals, and 15.4% had someone living alone who was 65 years of age or older. The average household size was 2.37 and the average family size was 2.9.

In the CDP the population was spread out, with 25.3% under the age of 20, 4.6% from 20 to 24, 18.4% from 25 to 44, 28.2% from 45 to 64, and 23.5% who were 65 years of age or older. The median age was 44.8 years. For every 100 females, there were 89.6 males.

The median income for a household in the CDP was $33,125, and the median income for a family was $39,205. Males had a median income of $29,755 versus $26,985 for females. The per capita income for the CDP was $18,260. About 5.3% of families and 7.4% of the population were below the poverty line, including 8.1% of those under age 18 and 5.8% of those age 65 or over.

Businesses
Major Businesses in Rio Communities include one convenience store, Allsup's; the 18-hole Tierra del Sol Golf Course; a Dollar General and two restaurants, Tierra del Sol, and the Longbow.

Government
The City Government is elected for four year terms with the Mayor, two Councilors, and the Municipal Judge off cycle by two years from the remaining two Councilors. The last Mayoral election was held in March 2018.

City Hall is located at 360 Rio Communities Blvd and the principle contact number is 505-861-6803. The City Council meets twice monthly, on the second and fourth Tuesday of each month, at 6:00pm at City Hall.

Education
Its school district is Belén Consolidated Schools. Belén High School is the district's comprehensive high school.

References

External links
 City of Rio Communities
 Belen Consolidated Schools

Cities in Valencia County, New Mexico
Cities in New Mexico
Albuquerque metropolitan area
Populated places established in 2013